Lomba may refer to:

Places 
 the Portuguese word for "hill"

Cape Verde 
 Lomba, Cape Verde, on the island of Fogo

Portugal 
 Lomba, a civil parish in Amarante Municipality,
 Lomba, a civil parish in the Gondomar Municipality
 Lomba, a civil parish in the Sabugal Municipality
 In the archipelago of the Azores
 Lomba (Lajes das Flores), a civil parish in the municipality of Lajes das Flores, Flores
 Lomba da Fazenda, a civil parish in the municipality of Nordeste, São Miguel
 Lomba da Maia, a civil parish in the municipality of Ribeira Grande, São Miguel
 Lomba de São Pedro, a civil parish in the municipality of Ribeira Grande, São Miguel
 Lomba do Pós, a settlement in the municipality of Povoação, São Miguel

Other uses 
 Lomba (film)
 Lomba (surname)